Kalum King is a Gaelic football player from County Down. He played for the Down senior inter-county football team and with his local club, Bryansford.

King first played for Down in 2004, when he played a role in Down's promotion run in the national league that year. He restarted his county career in 2010, and started every game in the 2010 league season. In the 2010 championship, the team progressed to the All-Ireland Final against Cork. He was appointed Down's vice-captain in 2012, and was captain for various games. He reportedly left the Down squad ahead of the 2014 Ulster Championship.

At club level, King was part of the Bryansford championship-winning side in 2003, and also part of the side that won the league title in 2014 after a match against Mayobridge in Kilcoo.

Outside of Gaelic games, King was also involved in boxing.

Honours
Down
All-Ireland Senior Football Championship (1): 2010 (runner-up)
National Football League Division 2 (2): 2004, 2010 (Promoted)
Bryansford
Down Senior Football Championship (1): 2003
Down Under-21 Football Championship (1): 2003
Down League Winner (1): 2014

References

Year of birth missing (living people)
Living people
Down inter-county Gaelic footballers